Akdağmadeni (Greek: Ἀργυρίων, Argyríōn) is a town and district in the Yozgat Province in the Central Anatolia region of Turkey. According to the 2000 census, population of the district is 61,373 of which 20,312 live in the town of Akdağmadeni. The district (or county) of Akdağmadeni is located in the east of the Yozgat province. It is surrounded to the north by the district of Kadışehri, in the south by Çayıralan, Sarikaya and Saraykent in the west and the Sarkisla district in the east.

According to the Ottoman population statistics of 1914, the kaza of Akdağmadeni had a total population of 48.759, consisting of 37.081 Muslims, 7.892 Greeks, 3.312 Armenians, 49 Protestants and 425 Roma. Most of the Armenians and Greeks were killed or expelled by 1923.

Climate

The district is situated in the central Anatolian plateau and shares its climatic peculiarities. Summers are very hot, winters are not extremely cold. Snowfall can be detected as soon as in mid-November. The average annual rainfall lies between 478 and 500 millimeters. In summer, temperatures are between 20 and 25 degrees Celsius. The annual average temperature varies between 8 and 12 degrees. Generally, the climate is quite damp. Winds blow mostly from the east and south. North wind against the mountains is a protective case.

Notes

References

External links
 District governor's official website 
 District municipality's official website 
 Akdagmadeni Municipality
 Akdagmadeni History
 Akdagmadeni Geographical Structure
 Akdagmadeni Structure of interest
 Akdagmadeni Economic Structure

Towns in Turkey
Populated places in Yozgat Province
Districts of Yozgat Province